Jonas Liwing (born  in Stockholm) is a Swedish professional ice hockey defenceman currently playing for the Sheffield Steelers in the Elite Ice Hockey League (EIHL). He has previously played with Djurgårdens IF and AIK of the Swedish Hockey League. He originally played with youth team IK Göta.

Liwing signed a one-year contract as a free agent with the Hamburg Freezers on May 18, 2015, after playing his first season in the German DEL with the Iserlohn Roosters in 2014–15.

References

External links
 

Living people
1983 births
AIK IF players
Djurgårdens IF Hockey players
IK Göta Ishockey players
Hamburg Freezers players
HC TWK Innsbruck players
Iserlohn Roosters players
IK Oskarshamn players
Dragons de Rouen players
Sheffield Steelers players
Södertälje SK players
Ice hockey people from Stockholm
Swedish ice hockey defencemen